Sant Longowal Institute of Engineering and Technology (abbreviated  SLIET i.e.ਸਲਾਇਟ सलाइट ) is a Govt. of India established (1989) deemed university under Section 3 of the UGC Act 1956 for higher education and research in India. The UG Program of SLIET is accredited as TIER 1 by the NBA ( National Board of Accreditation). SLIET is fully funded by the Ministry of Human Resource Development, and is an autonomous body controlled by the SLIET Society. Institute has been set up in the memory of Late Sh. Harchand Singh ji Longowal under Rajiv Longowal Punjab accord. Educational opportunities include technical and practical training in the fields of engineering and technology. The students and alumni of SLIET are informally referred to as SLIETians.

History

Established by the Ministry of Human Resource Development (MHRD) in 1989 and formally inaugurated by Sh. Arjun Singh, Minister of HRD, Gov. Of India, on 20 December 1991, SLIET was established to provide education in areas of engineering and technology. It was named in memory of Harchand Singh Longowal, a Sikh political party leader who was assassinated in 1985 after signing a peace accord with the government of Punjab.  At the time of Longowal's assassination, Prime Minister Rajiv Gandhi called it "a tragedy not just for Punjab but for the whole country. He worked courageously . . . to remove hatred from the hearts of men and to bring peace after so much strife and pain."

The institute initiated certificate and diploma programmes in 1991, and the degree programme in 1993. Post graduate courses in four disciplines were initiated in 2003. All degree programmes were accredited in 2003 by the All India Council for Technical Education, and an impact assessment and review were conducted by Educational Consultants India in 2004. The institute was previously affiliated to Punjab Technical University. However, it was later accorded the status of Deemed to be University during the year 2007–08.

SLIET got "DELL College of the Year 2019 Award" By Dell Technologies, Banglore.

Administration

The Board of Governors of SLIET is under the SLIET Society, and headed by Sh. Jagdish Rai Singal Managing Director of Eastman Industries Ltd., Eastman Cast & Forge Ltd. and Director of Eastman Auto & Power Ltd. and Ministry of Human Resource Development officials.
The Administration Section of SLIET, Longowal is having Dy. Registrar, Dr. Sanjay Gupta, who also looks after the library and function under the overall managerial control of the Registrar and Director.

SLIET receives its funding from the government, student fees and research funding by industry-sponsored projects.

The academic policies of SLIET are decided by its senate. It consists of all professors of the institute, administrators and students. Registrar is the member secretary of Senate.

There are four deans, who look after different functions who are appointed by Director for a period of two years, with registrar as the central officer, who is appointed by Board of Management and is also member secretary of building works committee, head of examinations, planning and monitoring board and only authorised official to make outside correspondence on behalf of Institute.

Admissions
The admissions to the B.Tech programs run by the institute is based on Joint Entrance Examination Main (JEE Main)  conducted across India. Admissions to the MTech programs are by the GATE exam conducted by the IITs and IISc. The postgraduate admission is on the basis of research and interviews by the appropriate screening committees.

For foreign students, admissions are done through Direct Admission of Students Abroad (DASA) scheme.

Campus

The property is landscaped and well maintained to provide for an aesthetically pleasing environment.

Academic units 
Departments :
 Chemical Engineering
 Chemistry
 Civil Engineering
 Computer Science & Engineering
Disabilities studies
 Electrical Engineering
 Electronics & Communication Engineering
Food Engineering & Technology
 Mathematics
 Mechanical Engineering
 Management and Humanities 
 Physics
Instrumentation and control engineering

Library

Health Center
The Health Center has been established in the institute premises, in a covered area of approx. 400 m2, with a capacity of four beds. It provides day to day medical facilities at primary level to the students, staff and faculty. For general awareness, the Health Center organizes various seminars/camps with the help of District Health Department.

Clubs and student forums
SLIET has various clubs like SSDC (SLIET Software Development Club),SVIESA, InternWell, Happy club, Team Mavericks, Endeavour, IIChE SLIET-Student Chapter etc. which span a range of interests among students. The clubs come under the purview of the Dean (Student-Faculty Welfare). Each club is represented by a coordinator who coordinates the activities of their respective club.

Hostels
There are 14 hostels (10 boys and 4 girls). The hostels are named after Indian scientists.

Ranking 

Sant Longowal Institute of Engineering and Technology was ranked 178 among engineering colleges in India by the National Institutional Ranking Framework (NIRF) in 2022.

Festivals
The major annual festival organised by SLIETians every year are :
TechFest : a tech festival of the college to showcase the technical skill of the students.TechFest'19
Madhuram : a cultural festival.
SocialFest : a social festival of college to motivate students towards social responsibilities.SocialFest'19

SPIC MACAY SLIET Chapter
SPICMACAY (Society for the Promotion
of Indian Classical Music and Culture
Amongst Youth) is a non-political
nationwide voluntary movement that
organizes programs of classical music
and dance, folk arts, crafts, yoga,
classic cinema screenings and much
more inside the schools and colleges
throughout the world to make
students more aware about the Indian
and world heritage. It was founded by
a renowned professor of IIT Delhi, Dr.
Kiran Seth in 1977.

SPICMACAY in SLIET, Longowal is an
official club which provides a great
platform for all the talented
performers. The club is not just an
exquisite platform to showcase the
talent but also an opportunity to grow
and learn from other fellow
performers and enhance their pre-
acquired skills. It also organizes
various workshops where famous and
approachable artists are invited to
learn more and improve.

See also
 National Institute of Technology, Jalandhar
 Indian Institute of Technology, Ropar

References

External links

 
1989 establishments in Punjab, India
Deemed universities in India
Education in Sangrur
Educational institutions established in 1989
Research institutes established in 1989
Engineering colleges in Punjab, India